The prix Femina essai is a French literary prize awarded to an essay. Established in 1999, it replaced the prix Femina Vacaresco.

List of laureates

See also 
Prix Femina
Prix Femina étranger

References 

French literary awards
Awards established in 1999
 
1999 establishments in France